"Born to Win" is the debut single of the Filipino girl group Bini. It was released on 4 June 2021 as a digital single by Star Music. MU Doctor Studio collaborated with Helsinki-based artist/composer Eva Louhivuori, who has worked also with Gugudan and Mirei Toyama; and RYVNG and Maynine of StupidSquad for the composition and arrangement of the song; mixing, mastering, and digital editing were done by Jang Tae In at Seoul Archive, who has worked also with BGYO's "The Light". 

The official track surpassed 100,000 streams on Spotify, 17 days after its release. The music video of "Born to Win" has received more than 200,000 YouTube views on its first 24 hours of release, making it the fastest among the debut music videos of any P-pop group.

Composition and lyrics
"Born to Win" is a full-length English song that runs for a total of two minutes and fifty-three seconds. The song is set in common time with a tempo of 108 beats per minute and written in the key of A minor. The lyrics were written by Eva Louhivuori, RYVNG and Maynine of StupidSquad. The chorus was contributed by Sophia Pae. 

The Manila Standard called "Born to Win" "an elegant, yet fierce electronic-pop track with strong melodic hooks, while showing off the group’s crisp vocals that speaks about courage, strength, and determination". Lionheartv.net described the track as "an electronic-pop tune where BINI sings about seizing the moment and rising above challenges".

Background and release
"Born to Win" premiered on Star Music YouTube channel late night of 3 June 2021 in the Philippines as a lyric video and on 4 June 2021, it was officially released worldwide via digital download.

The official music video was released on 11 June 2021 through BINI's official YouTube channel .

Reception
Lionheartv.net praised the single, stating that "BINI begins its new era with a bang, for its empowering single Born to Win". The Manila Standard described the song as part of "BINI's story [that] continues to unfold, pushing boundaries, and going for gold". Surej Singh of NME called the song "purportedly an inspirational anthem touching upon self-confidence and overcoming the obstacles thrown at us". JE C.C. of Dailypedia labeled the single as "the best new song about maturity, "Born to Win" imparts how experiences make you the better version of yourself".

Promotion

Virtual event
As part of the online concert, "BINI: The Launch", viewers were delighted with the sneak live performance of "Born to Win" before the official release of the music video. On 29 August 2021, the group performed "Born to Win" on "Happy Hallyu Day 5: A Virtual Fest".

Television
Bini performed the full length of "Born to Win" for the first time live on ASAP Natin 'To on 13 June 2021. On 3 July 2021, the group performed the song on It's Showtime for the first time.

On 19 September 2021, Bini teamed up with BGYO on a ASAP Natin 'To performance with The Light and "Born to Win". On 26 September 2021, the group performed the song in the coronation of the Miss Universe Philippines 2021.

Music video
Prior to the release of "Born to Win" official music video, teasers were posted throughout social media platforms.

The music video was presented in an electrifying sequences and various futuristic settings. It was produced by YouMeUs MNL, directed by Amiel Kirby Balagtas and written by Edgar Dale Reciña, who worked also with BGYO's He's Into Her. The opening scene features a solar eclipse with a narrative flash-forward scenes of Jhoana, Maloi, Aiah, Gwen, Stacey, Colet, Mikha and Sheena then leads to a luminous cube-shaped vessel, carrying the group, descending onto a rock formation interspersed with dance sequences choreographed by Star System of Cube Entertainment headed by Kim Hyunjin, who worked with K-Pop acts such as Hyuna, 4Minute, CLC, and (G)I-dle.

It was a well-received music video as it trended on YouTube on the day of its release.

Track listing
Digital
"Born to Win"2:53
"Born to Win" (Instrumental)2:53
"Born to Win" (EDM Version)2:47
"Born to Win" (String Quartet Version)3:03
"Born to Win" (Latin Version)2:57
"Born to Win" (Acapella)1:49

Credits and personnel
Credits adapted from the description of BINI's "Born to Win" music video:

Lyrics by: Eva Louhivuori  / Nordic Music Partners
Composed by: RYVNG(StupidSquad), Maynine(StupidSquad), Eva Louhivuori
Arranged by: RYVNG(StupidSquad), Maynine(StupidSquad)
Chorus by: Sophia Pae
Digital Editing by: Jang Tae In
Mixing & Mastering by: Jang Tae In at SEOUL ARCHIVE

In popular culture
On 18 June 2021, BINI introduced a "Born to Win" dance challenge via TikTok.

On 23 September 2021, the song played in the preliminaries of the Miss Universe Philippines 2021.

References

External links
 

Bini (group) songs
2021 songs
2021 debut singles
Star Music singles
English-language Filipino songs